Hossain Toufique Imam (15 January 1939 – 4 March 2021) was a Bangladesh Awami League politician and political advisor to the Prime Minister of Bangladesh, Sheikh Hasina. His rank was equivalent to a cabinet minister.

Early life

Imam was born on 15 January 1939. He completed his undergraduate in economics from Rajshahi University and graduate degree in economics from Dhaka University. He completed his post graduate from London School of Economics in development administration.

Career
Imam served as the cabinet secretary in the Mujibnagar government. He was the political advisor to the Prime Minister of Bangladesh. He blamed the Inter Service Intelligence for facilitating the July 2016 Dhaka attack.

Personal life 
Imam's son, Tanveer Imam, was elected to Parliament from Sirajganj-4 as a candidate of the Bangladesh Awami League in January 2014.

Death 
Imam died on 4 March 2021 at the Combined Military Hospital, Dhaka, Bangladesh.

References

1939 births
2021 deaths
University of Rajshahi alumni
University of Dhaka alumni
Alumni of the London School of Economics
Awami League politicians